Wu Zhengyan (born 1980, Taiyuan, Shanxi Province) is a contemporary Chinese painter based in Beijing. She graduated from Shanxi University in the Department of Art in 2004 and later taught in Beijing Agriculture college. It was in 2006 that she became a professional artist. As a member of the "post-80s" generation of artists in China, Wu has been involved in several group shows since 2003.

Impressed by the bright colors and patterns, Wu takes the cotton print as a carrier of her language so as to express her thinking towards life through painting. In 2002, she started to draw Coca-Cola, Statue of Liberty, Blessed Mother and Holy Son. Taking a piece of cloth with traditional Chinese Characteristics, she wanted to create a pictorial and language conflict between the two parts mentioned. So she found and installed the typical western images on the cotton print, thus leading to a contrast between the local and the foreign.

Born after the 1980s, Wu has been influence by two different cultures from childhood. The invisible tradition could not be cast away while the western culture was brought in, leading the social development with modernism. To combine the traditional cotton print with western commercial images, she showed her embarrassment under such circumstance.

In her creations afterwards, Wu started to care for life, existence and environment of herself and her surroundings. "Snack wrappings" or computer games were painted on cotton print to show her life and what she felt. Besides, her frustration and pressure while working as a teacher in a university in Beijing was also implied in her art works. Cotton Print is used as her diary book to mark down all those little details in her daily life.

In her latest solo exhibition "Flora Journal" in 798 Art Zone Beijing, paintings on silk as a new attempt in her creation were exhibited. Her latest paintings on cotton print, Silk scarf or canvas have built up some delicate intimacy between human-being, flowers and objects. Standing in front of her art work, audience were astonished by not only the bright colors but also the details hidden behind the flowers and leaves. The details from the microphone of "Chinese Talent Show" to grandpa Colonel Sanders in KFC, have cleverly interspersed charm and humour into the paintings.

It could be said that Wu Zhengyan expresses her thoughts towards art and life through her experiences in everyday life, just as by William Blake in "Auguries of Innocence", "To see a World in a grain of sand/And a heaven in a wild flower."

Exhibitions
Solo Exhibition : 
 2008 Yan’s Flower, Zhengyan Wu at Mountain Art Beijing Frank Lin Art Center, 798 Beijing
 2010 Flora Journal, Mountain Art Beijing Frank Lin Art Center, 798 Beijing
Group Exhibition : 
 2003 The beginning—present age oil painting arts exhibition, Shanxi, Taiyuan
 2003 The endless melody picture—explained photography exhibition, Shanxi, Yuci
 2004 Pingyao international photography festival, Shanxi, Pingyao
 2008 Art international HK 2008, HongKong
 2008 "Go China", Mountain Art Beijing Frank Lin Art Center, 798
 2008 Korea International Art Fair, Seoul, Korea
 2008 "Present 2008!", PYO Gallery, 798, Beijing
 2009 "Enliven - In Between Realities and Fiction" Animamix Biennial, Today Art Museum
 2009 "La Puissance De La Femme", 798, Beijing
 2011 "Made in China-New Chinese Contemporary Art Scene" National Dr. Sun Yat-sen Memorial Hall, Taipei
 2011  Shanghai Contemporary 2011, Shanghai Exhibition Hall, Shanghai
 2011  Made in China——New Chinese Contemporary Art Scene, Mountain Art Beijing & Frank Lin Art Center, Beijing
 2011	Language of Flowers——Group Exhibition of Artists, Mountain Art Beijing & Frank Lin Art Center, Beijing
 2012	Art Beijing 2012, National Agricultural Exhibition Hall, Beijing
 2012  2012 Next Super Stars, CANS Tea & Books House, Taipei

Notes and references

External links
Wu Zhengyan on Artnet 
 http://www.artnet.com/artist/425504234/wu-zhengyan.html

Flora Journal: Wu ZhengYan's Solo Exhibition 2010, on Artlinkart
 http://www.artlinkart.com/en/exhibition/overview/d0fbrtqo

Yan's Flower:Wu ZhengYan's Solo Exhibition 2008, on Artlinkart
 http://www.artlinkart.com/en/exhibition/overview/807guvl

Living people
1980 births
Artists from Shanxi
People from Taiyuan